Lysiphyllum is a genus of flowering plants in the legume family, subfamily Cercidoideae and tribe Bauhinieae.  It belongs to the subfamily Cercidoideae. It was formerly treated as part of the genus Bauhinia, but recent molecular phylogenetic analysis confirms that Lysiphyllum is a distinct genus from Bauhinia.

Species
Lysiphyllum comprises the following species:
 Lysiphyllum binatum (Blanco) de Wit
 Lysiphyllum carronii (F. Muell.) Pedley—northern beantree, red bauhinia
 Lysiphyllum cunninghamii (Benth.) de Wit
 Lysiphyllum dewitii (K. Larsen & S. S. Larsen) Bandyop. & Ghoshal
 Lysiphyllum diphyllum (Buch.-Ham.) de Wit
 Lysiphyllum dipterum (Blume ex Miq.) Bandyop. & Ghoshal
 Lysiphyllum gilvum (Bailey) Pedley
 Lysiphyllum hookeri (F. Muell.) Pedley—white bauhinia, pegunny, mountain ebony, Queensland ebony, Hooker's bauhinia
 Lysiphyllum strychnifolium (W. G. Craib) A. Schmitz
 Lysiphyllum winitii (Craib) de Wit

References

Cercidoideae
Fabaceae genera